Cerithiopsis iuxtafuniculata is a species of sea snail, a gastropod in the family Cerithiopsidae. It was described by Rolan, Espinosa and Fernandez-Garcés, in 2007.

References

 Rolán E., Espinosa J. & Fernández-Garcés R. (2007) The family Cerithiopsidae in Cuba. 4. The genus Cerithiopsis s. l., the banded and the variably coloured species. Neptunea 6(2): 1-29.
 Cecalupo A. & Robba E. (2010) The identity of Murex tubercularis Montagu, 1803 and description of one new genus and two new species of the Cerithiopsidae (Gastropoda: Triphoroidea). Bollettino Malacologico 46: 45-64.

iuxtafuniculata
Gastropods described in 2007